Čukarka is a village located in the municipality of Preševo, Serbia. According to the 2002 census, the village has a population of 512 people. Of these, 427 (83,39 %) were ethnic Albanians, and 85 (16,60 %) were Serbs.

References

Populated places in Pčinja District
Albanian communities in Serbia